The 1994–95 Omani League was the 21st edition of the top football league in Oman. Dhofar S.C.S.C. were the defending champions, having won the previous 1993–94 Omani League season. Sur SC emerged as the champions of the 1994–95 Omani League with a total of 58 points.

Stadia and locations

League table

Championship play-off

References

Top level Omani football league seasons
1994–95 in Omani football
Oman